Union council may refer to:

Union Council of Ministers, a government body in India
Union council (Bangladesh), an administrative unit in Bangladesh
Union council (Pakistan), an administrative unit in Pakistan
Union Council (students' union), an administrative body in a students' union
Union Council, a former council with the BSA

See also
Union of Councils for Soviet Jews